The 1978 NHL Dispersal Draft was held on June 15, 1978. It was the result of the merger of two National Hockey League (NHL) teams, the Cleveland Barons and the Minnesota North Stars. The NHL granted majority ownership of the North Stars to Barons owners Gordon Gund and George Gund III, after their bid to buy the Barons' home arena failed, and as the League feared the ownership group of the North Stars, another team performing poorly amid waning fan interest, would cease that team’s operations. To prevent the North Stars from folding, the NHL allowed the Gunds to merge them with the Barons; the Gunds would be majority owners of the resulting team, which stayed in Minnesota and used the North Stars' name.

The merged team was allowed to protect 14 players, then the five poorest teams in the NHL were granted access to pick one player each from the unprotected players in a dispersal draft. Only two of the teams picked a player, at which point the merged team was allowed to protect a 15th player; two others declined, and the last exchanged their pick for an extra first-round pick in the 1978 NHL Amateur Draft, held the following day. The remaining unprotected players remained members of the merged team; the large (two combined teams) roster of players was kept, traded or assigned to minor league affiliates to get the merged North Stars down to its opening day roster for the  season.

Background
After the 1977–78 NHL season, Barons owners Gordon Gund and George Gund III tried to buy the Richfield Coliseum, but failed. Meanwhile, fan interest in the North Stars was in decline as the team had missed the playoffs in five of the previous six seasons, and the league feared that the franchise was also on the verge of folding. On June 14, 1978, the league, in an unprecedented arrangement, granted approval for the Barons to merge with the North Stars, under the Gunds' ownership.

Players selected
The merged team continued to be known as the Minnesota North Stars but assumed the Barons' place in the Adams Division. General managers Lou Nanne (North Stars) and Harry Howell (Barons) worked together to pick the protected players, protecting an equal number from each team. From the North Stars they retained Per-Olov Brasar, Brad Maxwell, Bryan Maxwell, Glen Sharpley, Tim Young and goalie Pete LoPresti. From the Barons they protected Mike Fidler, Rick Hampton, Al MacAdam, Dennis Maruk, Greg Smith and goalie Gilles Meloche. After the Washington Capitals and St. Louis Blues had made their selections the North Stars would be able to add another player to their protected list (Ron Zanussi), and again after the Vancouver Canucks and Pittsburgh Penguins had made their choices (Bob Stewart).

On June 15, 1978, just before the Amateur Draft, the five weakest teams were allowed to make one pick from the unprotected Minnesota and Cleveland players. The Capitals forfeited their pick but were allowed an extra first round pick in the Amateur Draft. The Blues picked Mike Crombeen (Cleveland), and the Canucks picked Randy Holt (Cleveland). Both the Penguins and Colorado Rockies declined to select a player.

Aftermath
The recently retired Lou Nanne was named general manager of the merged team, and a number of the Barons players – notably goaltender Gilles Meloche and forwards Al MacAdam and Mike Fidler – bolstered the Minnesota lineup. Furthermore, Minnesota drafted Bobby Smith, who won the Calder Memorial Trophy as the NHL's top rookie that year, and Steve Payne, who recorded 42 goals in his second campaign in 1979–80.

A stay-at-home defenceman who was selected by the California Golden Seals in the 1975 NHL Draft, Greg Smith followed the franchise when it relocated to Cleveland in 1976, and upon the merger with Minnesota, his rights were protected by the North Stars in the dispersal draft. He played for Minnesota for three seasons, and his solid defensive play helped guide them to the finals in 1981.

Thirteen years later, in 1991, the merger was effectively undone as the Gunds assumed ownership of the expansion San Jose Sharks (occupying the same market as the Golden Seals did prior to their move to Cleveland) and the two teams split the players on the North Stars at the time in a Dispersal Draft, followed by an Expansion Draft.  The North Stars moved to Dallas as the Dallas Stars in 1993. (Incidentally, the Barons name would come full circle: the Sharks formed their own minor-league team in Cleveland, also named the Cleveland Barons, from 2001 to 2006.)

The Barons remain the last franchise in the four major North American sports leagues to cease operations, and as a result the NHL fielded only 17 teams during the 1978–79 season.  The NHL did not return to Ohio for 22 years, when the Columbus Blue Jackets  began operations in the fall of 2000.

Dennis Maruk was the last Baron (and last Golden Seal as well) to be active in the NHL, retiring from the North Stars after the 1988–89 season with 356 goals in 888 games.

References

Cleveland Barons (NHL)
Minnesota North Stars
National Hockey League expansion drafts
Dis